The National Commander of the Civil Air Patrol (acronym: CAP/CC) is the highest senior official in the Civil Air Patrol (CAP) — a non-profit corporation Congressionally chartered to operate as the civilian auxiliary of the United States Air Force — of the United States. The national commander also serves as the chief executive officer of the CAP Corporation.

In addition, the U.S. Air Force maintains Civil Air Patrol–U.S. Air Force, a U.S. Air Force command whose commander is responsible for overseeing CAP programs, liaison between the CAP and U.S. Air Force and other United States Government  agencies, and ensuring U.S. Air Force and other U.S. Government support to the CAP.

History
From its creation on 1 December 1941 until 31 August 1975, the CAP national commander was an appointed active duty commissioned officer — typically a general officer — of the United States Army Air Forces (until September 1947) or the United States Air Force (after it became an independent service in September 1947). The national commander chaired the CAP National Board.

Upon adoption of the CAP Constitution and Bylaws on 26 May 1948, the CAP was incorporated and officially became the civilian auxiliary of the U.S. Air Force, the Chairman of the CAP National Board became the national commander, and the CAP National Board was redesignated as the National Executive Board (NEB), with the national commander as its chair. General Carl A. Spaatz, USAF, became the first chairman after the incorporation of the CAP after he retired from the Air Force in 1948. The board became the National Executive Committee (NEC) on 26 April 1960, with the national commander continuing as its chair.

On 1 September 1975, the position of chairman of the national board was redesignated as national commander, held by an active civilian CAP member with the CAP rank of brigadier general, with only sitting and former national commanders who served in the position on or after 1 September 1975 holding the CAP rank of brigadier general. At the same time, the former U.S. Air Force-appointed national commander position was redesignated as the executive director of the CAP. On 8 March 1995, during a reorganization of CAP National Headquarters, the title of executive director was changed to senior Air Force advisor.

On 1 December 2002, the national commander position was elevated to the rank of major general, with the national vice commander becoming a brigadier general. Current and former national commanders who held the position after 1 December 2002 are the only CAP members who hold the CAP rank of major general. Former national commanders who held the position prior to 1 December 2002 and sitting national vice commanders and those who held the position of national vice commander on or after 1 December 2002 are the only CAP members who hold the CAP rank of brigadier general.

Since 2012, the national commander of the CAP also has served as the chief executive officer of the CAP Corporation.

The current National Commander of the Civil Air Patrol is Major General Edward Phelka.

Civil Air Patrol-United States Air Force
Civil Air Patrol-United States Air Force (CAP-USAF) is a U.S. Air Force command responsible for ensuring the CAP is organized, trained, and equipped to fulfill Air Force-assigned missions. Operating alongiside the CAP's civilian leadership, CAP-USAF provides day-to-day support, advice, and liaison to the CAP’s more than 60,000 members and provides oversight for CAP programs, with emphasis on safety and program requirements. CAP-USAF personnel are also the primary function interface between other federal agencies and the CAP.

As of 2020, CAP-USAF was staffed with approximately 200 active-duty, United States Air Force Reserve, and civilian personnel at CAP National Headquarters at Maxwell Air Force Base and locations in New Jersey (Detachment 1, McGuire Air Force Base), Maryland (Detachment 2, Andrews Air Force Base), Ohio (Detachment 3, Wright-Patterson Air Force Base), Georgia (Detachment 4, Dobbins Air Reserve Base), Minnesota (Detachment 5), Texas (Detachment 6), Colorado (Detachment 7, Peterson Space Force Base), California (Detachment 8, Beale Air Force Base), and Florida, as well as in Puerto Rico and at several overseas Air Force installations.

List of officeholders

U.S. Army Air Forces/U.S. Air Force commanders 

Maj Gen John F. Curry, USAAF,  Dec 1941 – Mar 1942
Col Earle L. Johnson, USAAF,  Mar 1942 – Feb 1947
Brig Gen Frederic H. Smith Jr., USAAF/USAF,  February 21, 1947 – September 30, 1947
Maj Gen Lucas V. Beau, USAF,  October 1, 1947 –  May 1948

Chairman of the National Board (1948–1975)

Gen Carl A. Spaatz, USAF (Ret), Aug 1948 – Apr 1959
Col (later Brig Gen) D. Harold Byrd, CAP, Apr 1959 – Apr 1960
Col (later Brig Gen) William C. Whelen, CAP, Apr 1960 – Apr 1962
Col (later Brig Gen) Paul W. Turner, CAP, Sep 1962 – Oct 1965
Brig Gen Lyle W. Castle, CAP, Oct 1965 – Oct 1968
Brig Gen F. Ward Reilly, CAP, Oct 1968 – Oct 1970
Brig Gen Samuel H. DuPont, Jr., CAP, Oct 1970 – Oct 1973
Brig Gen William M. Patterson, CAP, Oct 1973 – Aug 1975

CAP National Commanders (1975–present)

USAAF/CAP-USAF Commanders
U.S. Army Air Forces and U.S. Air Force national commanders of the CAP prior to its 1948 incorporation are considered part of the lineage of the command history of CAP-USAF.

Maj Gen John F. Curry, USAAF,  Dec 1941 – Mar 1942
Col Earle L. Johnson, USAAF,  Mar 1942 – Feb 1947
Brig Gen Frederic H. Smith Jr., USAF,  February 21, 1947 – September 30, 1947
Maj Gen Lucas V. Beau, USAF,  October 1, 1947 – December 31, 1955
Maj Gen Walter R. Agee, USAF,   January 1, 1956 – March 31, 1959
Brig Gen Stephen D. McElroy, USAF,  April 1, 1959 – December 15, 1961
Col Paul C. Ashworth, USAF,  December 15, 1961 – July 31, 1964
Col Joe L. Mason, USAF,  August 1, 1964 – April 30, 1967
Brig Gen William W. Wilcox, USAF,  May 1, 1967 – October 31, 1968
Maj Gen Walter B. Putnam, USAF,  November 1, 1968 – October 31, 1969
Brig Gen Richard N. Ellis, USAF,  November 1, 1969 – October 31, 1972
Brig Gen Leslie J. Westberg, USAF,  November 1, 1972 – August 28, 1975
Brig Gen Car S. Miller, USAF,  August 29, 1975 – Nov 1977
Brig Gen Paul E. Gardner, USAF,  Nov 1977 – July 31, 1980
Brig Gen H. W. Miller, USAF,  August 1, 1980 – Aug 1981
Brig Gen David L. Patton, USAF,  Aug 1981 – May 1984
Col John T. Massingale Jr., USAF,  May 1984 – October 31, 1989
Col Clyde O. Westbrook Jr., USAF,  November 1, 1989 – Jun 1990
Col Joseph M. Nall, USAF,  Jun 1990 – Aug 1992
Col Ronald T. Sampson, USAF,  Aug 1992 – Mar 1995
Col Garland W. Padgett Jr., USAF,  Mar 1995 – May 1998
Col Dennis B. Parkhurst, USAF,  May 1998 – Jul 2001
Col Albert A. Allenback, USAF,  Jul 2001 – Jul 2002
Col George C. Vogt, USAF,  Jul 2002 – Oct 2005
Col Russell D. Hodgkins Jr., USAF,  Oct 2005 – Apr 2009
Col William R. (Bill) Ward, USAF,  Apr 2009 – June 31, 2011
Col George H. Ross III, USAF,  July 1, 2011 – October 4, 2011
Col Paul D. Gloyd II, USAF,  October 4, 2011 – May 2014
Col Jay Updegraff, USAF,  May 2014 – Aug 2014
Col Michael D. Tyynismaa, USAF, Aug 2014 – Apr 2019
Col  Mark A. Wootan, USAF, Apr 2019 – present

Notes

References

 
Civil Air Patrol
People of the Civil Air Patrol
Lists of American military personnel